Coralliophila erosa is a species of sea snail, a marine gastropod mollusk in the family Muricidae, the murex snails or rock snails.

Description
The shell size varies between 15 mm and 35 mm

Distribution
This marine species occurs in the Red Sea and in the Indian Ocean off Aldabra, Madagascar, the Mascarene Basin and Tanzania; in the Indo-West Pacific.

References

 Souverbie, M. (1861) Descriptions d'espèces nouvelles de l'Archipel Calédonien. Journal de Conchyliologie, 9, 271–284, pl. 11.
 Dautzenberg, Ph. (1929). Mollusques testacés marins de Madagascar. Faune des Colonies Francaises, Tome III
 Oliverio M. (2008) Coralliophilinae (Neogastropoda: Muricidae) from the southwest Pacific. In: V. Héros, R.H. Cowie & P. Bouchet (eds), Tropical Deep-Sea Benthos 25. Mémoires du Muséum National d'Histoire Naturelle 196: 481–585. page(s): 493
 Kilburn R.N., Marais J.P. & Marais A.P. (2010) Coralliophilinae. pp. 272–292, in: Marais A.P. & Seccombe A.D. (eds), Identification guide to the seashells of South Africa. Volume 1. Groenkloof: Centre for Molluscan Studies. 376 pp.
 Severns, M. (2011). Shells of the Hawaiian Islands - The Sea Shells. Conchbooks, Hackenheim. 564 pp.
 Liu, J.Y. [Ruiyu] (ed.). (2008). Checklist of marine biota of China seas. China Science Press. 1267 pp

External links
 
 ]https://biodiversitylibrary.org/page/15855134 Petit de la Saussaye, S. (1851). Description de coquilles nouvelles. Journal de Conchyliologie. 2: 259-269; pl. 7 fig. 1-4, 7-8; pl. 8 fig. 3, 5-9]
 Kilburn, R.N. (1977) Taxonomic studies on the marine Mollusca of southern Africa and Mozambique. Part 1. Annals of the Natal Museum, 23, 173–214

Gastropods described in 1798
Coralliophila